Players and pairs who neither have high enough rankings nor receive wild cards may participate in a qualifying tournament held one week before the annual Wimbledon Tennis Championships.

Seeds

  Jürgen Zopp (qualified)
  Daniel Brands (first round)
  Frederico Gil (first round)
  Michael Russell (qualified)
  Jesse Levine (qualified)
  Rogério Dutra Silva (first round)
  Michael Berrer (first round)
  Rajeev Ram (qualifying competition)
  Simone Bolelli (qualified)
  Roberto Bautista Agut (qualifying competition)
  Brian Baker (qualified)
  Daniel Gimeno Traver (first round)
  Alessandro Giannessi (second round)
  Bobby Reynolds (first round)
  Daniel Muñoz de la Nava (first round)
  Aljaž Bedene (first round)
  Marco Chiudinelli (second round)
  Ruben Bemelmans (qualified)
  Teymuraz Gabashvili (second round)
  Wayne Odesnik (qualifying competition, lucky loser)
  Ryan Sweeting (qualified)
  Florent Serra (qualified)
  Arnaud Clément (first round)
  Jerzy Janowicz (qualified)
  Marsel İlhan (second round)
  Rik de Voest (first round)
  Thiago Alves (second round)
  João Sousa (second round)
  Augustin Gensse (first round)
  Antonio Veić (first round)
  Íñigo Cervantes (qualified)
  Andrey Kuznetsov (qualified)

Qualifiers

  Jürgen Zopp
  Adrián Menéndez Maceiras
  Guillaume Rufin
  Michael Russell
  Jesse Levine
  Florent Serra
  Ryan Sweeting
  Dustin Brown
  Simone Bolelli
  Jimmy Wang
  Brian Baker
  Kenny de Schepper
  Ruben Bemelmans
  Íñigo Cervantes
  Jerzy Janowicz
  Andrey Kuznetsov

Lucky losers
  Wayne Odesnik

Qualifying draw

First qualifier

Second qualifier

Third qualifier

Fourth qualifier

Fifth qualifier

Sixth qualifier

Seventh qualifier

Eighth qualifier

Ninth qualifier

Tenth qualifier

Eleventh qualifier

Twelfth qualifier

Thirteenth qualifier

Fourteenth qualifier

Fifteenth qualifier

Sixteenth qualifier

External links

 2012 Wimbledon Championships – Men's draws and results at the International Tennis Federation

Men's Singles Qualifying
Wimbledon Championship by year – Men's singles qualifying